Reply of the Zaporozhian Cossacks is a painting by Ilya Repin.  It is also known as Cossacks of Saporog Are Drafting a Manifesto and Cossacks are Writing a Letter to the Turkish Sultan.

Repin began the 2.03 m (6 foot 8 inch) by 3.58 m (11 foot 9 inch) canvas in 1880 and finished in 1891. His study drawings he made in stanitsa Pashkovskaya (today within Krasnodar), Yekaterinoslav (today Dnipro), and Kachanivka. 

He recorded the years of work along the lower edge of the canvas. Alexander III bought the painting for 35,000 rubles.  Since then, the canvas has been exhibited in the State Russian Museum in Saint Petersburg with another version by Repin in the Kharkiv Art Museum in Kharkiv, Ukraine.

Context

Historicity 

Reply of the Zaporozhian Cossacks depicts a supposedly historical tableau, set in 1676, and based on the legend of Cossacks sending an insulting reply to an ultimatum from the Sultan of the Ottoman Empire, Mehmed IV.

According to the story, the Zaporozhian Cossacks (from "beyond the rapids", Ukrainian: za porohamy), inhabiting the lands around the lower Dnieper River in Ukraine, had defeated Ottoman Empire forces in battle. However, despite his army having suffered this loss to them, Mehmed demanded that the Cossacks submit to Ottoman rule. The Cossacks, led by Ivan Sirko, replied in a characteristic manner; they wrote a letter, replete with insults and profanities. The painting exhibits the Cossacks' pleasure at striving to come up with ever more base vulgarities.

In the 19th century, the historical Zaporozhian Cossacks were sometimes the subject of picaresque tales demonstrating admiration of their primitive vitality and contemptuous disregard for authority (in marked contrast to the more civilized subjects of the authoritarian Russian state). Whether the incident portrayed actually happened or is just another of these tales is not known, but no concrete or reliable evidence exists that it did happen, although the question remains disputed.

U.S.-based Slavic and Eastern European historian Daniel C. Waugh (1978) observed: "The correspondence of the sultan with the Chyhyryn Cossacks had undergone a textual transformation sometime in the eighteenth century whereby the Chyhyryntsy became the Zaporozhians and the controlled satire of the reply was debased into vulgarity. In this vulgar version, the Cossack correspondence spread quite widely in the nineteenth century. (...) The best-known reflection of the nineteenth-century popularity of the Cossack correspondence is the famous painting by II'ia Repin showing the uproarious Zaporozhians penning their reply."

Repin's interpretation 
Nikolai Gogol's 1842 romantic-historical novella Taras Bulba describes the incident in passing. Repin associated with Savva Mamontov and his artistic circle and probably heard the story there; at any rate, Repin made his first sketches for the painting in Mamontov's home.

While working on the original version, Repin in 1889 began work on a second version. This work remained unfinished. The artist tried to make the second version of The Cossacks more "historically authentic". In 1932 it was transferred by the Tretyakov Gallery to the M. F. Sumtsov Kharkiv Historical Museum. This canvas is slightly smaller than the original version.

The historian Dmytro Yavornytsky assisted Repin in portraying the scene authentically.

During the Russian invasion of eastern Ukraine in March 2022, when the Kharkiv region came under heavy artillery and air fire, the museum staff rushed to remove their artworks from the museum to a safer place.   The second version of  The Cossacks was amongst the artworks relocated for safety.

Models 
The "Cossacks” who posed for the painting were friends of Repin and academics from Saint Petersburg University, and included men  of Ukrainian, Russian, Cossack, Jewish and Polish ancestry.

Depictions 

The image has become a well-known reference in Russian culture, parodied or emulated by other work such as political cartoons, including Members of Duma drafting a reply to Stolypin and Soviet leaders write the letter of defiance to George Curzon, seen below. It is also referenced in other works, such as both the 2009 Russian film Taras Bulba, which depicts the scene itself, and the American film of the same name (which includes the painting in its opening credits); both are adaptations of a historical novella by that name, though the novella does not include the scene.

Beyond Russia, the painting is frequently used as a symbol or metonymy for Cossacks in general. The "Cossacks" expansion to the video game Europa Universalis IV adapted the text of the reply for its trailer and included artwork based on the original painting, the game Cossacks: European Wars has the central detail of the picture in its logo, and the game Cossacks 3 has the painting as the background of the main menu.

The text has inspired several adaptations; most notable is probably the French versification by Guillaume Apollinaire, included as "Réponse des Cosaques Zaporogues au Sultan de Constantinople" as part of his poem "La Chanson du mal-aimé", in his 1913 collection Alcools. This version was set to music by Dmitri Shostakovich in his Symphony No. 14, amongst other poets, and by French singer-songwriter Léo Ferré, in a full oratorio on La Chanson du mal-aimé in 1953.

Not all treatment of the painting has been positive. Particularly, art critic Clement Greenberg's influential 1939 essay Avant-Garde and Kitsch selected Repin's painting as an example of "kitsch".

References

Book references
 Dmytro I. Yavornytsky (1895) History of the Zaporogian Cossacks, Vol. 2, pp. 517–518. St. Petersburg. Available in both modern Ukrainian and Russian language editions.
  Myron B. Kuropas (1961) The Saga of Ukraine: An Outline History. MUN Enterprises
 Саєнко В.М. (2004) "Лист до турецького султана" та деякі міфологічні відповідності // Нові дослідження пам’яток козацької доби в Україні. – Вип.13. – К. – С. 418–420.
 Prymak, Thomas M., "Message to Mehmed: Repin Creates his Zaporozhian Cossacks," in his Ukraine, the Middle East, and the West (Montreal and Kingston: McGill-Queen's University Press, 2021), pp. 173–200.
 Jack Carr, (2019) True Believer, Atria/Emily Bestler Books, chapter 67.

External links
 The Cossack Letter
 .  A detailed analysis of the letter and its different variants.
 History of the painting 
 Reply of the Zaporozhian Cossacks. Outstanding Paintings. St. Peterburg, 1966. p. 271 
 Versified version of the letter sung by singer-songwriter Léo Ferré and choir (1972)

1891 paintings
Collections of the Russian Museum
Paintings by Ilya Repin
17th century in the Zaporozhian Host
Paintings of people
Political art
Works about Cossacks
Musical instruments in art